This list of Chesapeake Bay rivers includes the main rivers draining into the Chesapeake Bay estuarine complex on the mid-Atlantic eastern coast of the United States, North America. The three largest rivers in order of both discharge and watershed area are the Susquehanna River, the Potomac River, and the James River. Other major rivers include the Rappahannock River, the Appomattox River (which flows into the lower James River), the York River (a combination of the Pamunkey and Mattaponi tributary rivers), the Patuxent River, and the Choptank River.

The entire Chesapeake Bay watershed includes portions of six states (New York, Pennsylvania, West Virginia, Maryland, Virginia, and Delaware) and the District of Columbia. The watershed of the entire Chesapeake Bay covers 165,760 km2 (approximately 64,000 mi2 or 41 million acres ). With an estuary water body area of only 11,600 km2 (4,479 mi2), the land-to-water ratio is about 14:1. Therefore, the rivers flowing into the Chesapeake Bay have a large influence on water quality in the estuary. The rivers flowing into the Chesapeake Bay act as sources of nutrients and sediments from land, which affect the health of the downstream estuary. The larger rivers cross the Atlantic seaboard fall line. Over time, many large cities emerged where these rivers cross the fall line as watermills allowed for the production of material goods. Colonial-era logging, farming, and later construction of mill dams have altered streams and trapped mud in much of the Chesapeake Bay watershed.

Largest rivers 

[*] James values are the sums of flows and watershed areas of the James and Appomattox rivers.
[**] York values are the sums of flows and watershed areas of the Mattaponi and Pamunkey tributary rivers.

Other tributary rivers and tidal inlets 
In addition to the largest rivers listed above, the following rivers drain directly into the Chesapeake Bay:

Eastern shore tributary rivers 
 Pocomoke River
 Little Annemessex River
 Big Annemessex River
 Manokin River
 Monie Creek
 Wicomico River (Maryland eastern shore) 
 Nanticoke River
 Transquaking River
 Blackwater River (Maryland)
 Honga River
 Little Choptank River
 Miles River
 Front River
 Wye River (Maryland)
 Chester River
 Sassafras River
 Elk River (Maryland)
 North East River
 Principio Creek

Western shore tributary rivers 
 Swan Creek
 Romney Creek
 Bush River (Maryland)
 Gunpowder River
 Middle River (Maryland)
 Back River (Maryland)
 Patapsco River
 Magothy River
 Whitehall Creek (Maryland)
 Severn River (Maryland)
 South River (Maryland)
 West River (Maryland)
 Rhode River
 St. Marys River (Maryland)
 Little Wicomico River
 Great Wicomico River
 Piankatank River
 East River (Virginia)
 North River (Mobjack Bay)
 Ware River (Virginia)
 Severn River (Virginia)
 Poquoson River
 Back River (Virginia)
 Hampton River
 Elizabeth River (Virginia)
 Lynnhaven River

See also 

 Atlantic Seaboard Fall Line
 Atlantic seaboard watershed
 Chesapeake Bay
 Chesapeake Bay Program
 Chesapeake Bay Foundation
 Hydrology
 List of rivers of the United States
 List of rivers of Maryland
 List of rivers of Virginia
 Mid-Atlantic (United States)
 Mississippi River System
 :Category:Tributaries of the Chesapeake Bay

References 

Chesapeake Bay watershed
Estuaries of the United States
Rivers of the United States
Hydrology lists